The Lusk Water Tower was built in 1886 to provide water for steam locomotives on the former Fremont, Elkhorn and Missouri Valley Railroad, at Lusk, Wyoming. Lusk itself was built by the railroad at the same time. The tank was originally located in the middle of Lusk near the railroad depot and was moved in 1919 to the present site on the east edge of town, adjacent to what became the Chicago and North Western Transportation Company line now owned by Union Pacific.

The structure is believed to be composed of Douglas fir, while the tank itself is redwood. It is the only surviving structure of its kind in Wyoming.

The water tower was placed on the National Register of Historic Places in 1991.

References

External links
 at the National Park Service's NRHP database
Lusk Water Tower at the Wyoming State Historic Preservation Office

Buildings and structures in Niobrara County, Wyoming
Infrastructure completed in 1886
Towers completed in 1886
Industrial buildings and structures on the National Register of Historic Places in Wyoming
Water towers on the National Register of Historic Places
Towers in Wyoming
Railway buildings and structures on the National Register of Historic Places
Chicago and North Western Railway
National Register of Historic Places in Niobrara County, Wyoming
Railway buildings and structures on the National Register of Historic Places in Wyoming
1886 establishments in Wyoming Territory